Eva Orner is an Australian Academy and Emmy Award-winning film producer and director based in Los Angeles. Her works include Untold Desires (winner of Best Documentary at the Australian Film Institute Awards,

the Logie Awards and the Australian Human Rights Awards), Strange Fits of Passion (nominated for the Critics' Award at the Cannes Film Festival), Taxi to the Dark Side (winner of the 2008 Academy Award for Best Documentary), and Gonzo, The Life and Work of Dr. Hunter S. Thompson. Orner's directorial debut, The Network, a feature documentary set behind the scenes of Afghanistan's largest television station, premiered in the US in March 2013.

Career 
Orner grew up in Melbourne, Victoria, and was educated at Mount Scopus Memorial College and Monash University, where she earned a Bachelor of Arts degree in 1993.

Orner, along with actress Cate Blanchett, was one of only two Australians nominated for an Oscar in 2008. Most commentators predicted that Michael Moore's Sicko would win the Best Documentary category. However, to the surprise of many, Orner's Taxi to the Dark Side, which examines US torture practices in Afghanistan, Iraq and Guantánamo Bay, received the award.

Within hours, Orner created controversy by describing the US Government as "a bunch of war criminals".

Orner directed and produced the AACTA award winning feature documentary Chasing Asylum. Released in 2016 the film takes a critical look at Australia's treatment of refugees and asylum seekers.

She also directed and produced Bikram: Yogi, Guru, Predator, for Netflix, released in 2019 that had its world premier at the Toronto International Film Festival.

Her latest film is Burning, for Amazon, which was released in 2021, about climate change and the Black Summer Australian fires of 2019-2020. Burning had its world premiere at the Toronto International Film Festival.

References

External links 

 

Australian documentary film producers
Directors of Best Documentary Feature Academy Award winners
Monash University alumni
Living people
Date of birth missing (living people)
Australian Jews
Australian women film producers
Women documentary filmmakers
Australian documentary film directors
Australian women film directors
Year of birth missing (living people)